Phomopsis is a genus of ascomycete fungi in the family Valsaceae.

Species
Species include:
 Phomopsis arnoldiae
 Phomopsis asparagi
 Phomopsis asparagicola
 Phomopsis azadirachtae
 Phomopsis cannabina
 Phomopsis caricae-papayae
 Phomopsis coffeae
 Phomopsis durionis Syd. 1932
 Phomopsis elaeagni
 Phomopsis ganjae
 Phomopsis javanica
 Phomopsis juniperovora
 Phomopsis lokoyae
 Phomopsis longicolla
 Phomopsis mangiferae
 Phomopsis obscurans
 Phomopsis perseae
 Phomopsis pittospori
 Phomopsis prunorum
 Phomopsis sojae
 Phomopsis scabra
 Phomopsis sclerotioides
 Phomopsis tanakae
 Phomopsis theae
 Phomopsis viticola

Formerly placed here:
Phomopsis vaccinii, now Diaporthe vaccinii
Phomopsis leptostromiformis, now Diaporthe toxica

Dead-arm infection
One of the species of this genus, P. viticola, cause a grape disease called Phomopsis or dead-arm.  Usually, infections begin during early growth stages in spring.  This affects leaves, fruit, rachises, and shoots of a plant.

This disease causes the formation of lesions on shoots, leaves, and rachises, but also can cause fruit rot.

It causes significant economic damage to grape vines.

Another Phomopsis species, P. juniperovora, infects junipers, and is a particularly important pest of seedlings and juvenile plants in the nursery industry.

See also
 List of soybean diseases

References

External links
 http://winegrapes.tamu.edu/grow/diseases/phomopsis.shtml
 http://na.fs.fed.us/spfo/pubs/fidls/phomopsis/phomopsis.htm

 
Diaporthales
Soybean diseases
Sordariomycetes genera
Taxa named by Pier Andrea Saccardo
Taxa named by Casimir Roumeguère